Wah Fu is an area located in Southern District, on Hong Kong Island, Hong Kong.

Wah Fu mainly consists of the public housing estates, Wah Fu Estate and Wah Kwai Estate. They were built near Waterfall Bay (瀑布灣) and Kellett Bay (雞籠灣).

The area also has a notable beach known as Waterfall Bay (瀑布灣). It is long believed that the waterfall at Waterfall Bay Park attracted British ships coming to Hong Kong to fetch fresh water after their long journey.

Transport
Transport is primarily by bus and minibus. More than thirty bus routes pass through the area. Wah Fu station, of the proposed South Island line West Section of the MTR will be in Wah Fu.

See also
 List of places in Hong Kong
Pok Fu Lam

References 

 

Kellett Bay
Places in Hong Kong
Southern District, Hong Kong

zh:華富邨